The 1500 meters distance for women in the 2013–14 ISU Speed Skating World Cup was contested over six races on six occasions, out of a total of six World Cup occasions for the season, with the first occasion taking place in Calgary, Alberta, Canada, on 8–10 November 2013, and the final occasion taking place in Heerenveen, Netherlands, on 14–16 March 2014.

Ireen Wüst of the Netherlands won the cup, while compatriot Lotte van Beek came second, and Brittany Bowe of the United States came third. The defending champion, Marrit Leenstra of the Netherlands, ended up in fifth place.

Top three

Race medallists

Standings 
Standings as of 14 March 2014 (end of the season).

References 

 
Women 1500
ISU